The Kaiserstuhl–Rhine Black Forest Trail is an east–west hiking trail of several days' duration through the Black Forest in Germany from Donaueschingen to Breisach. The 109-kilometre-long hiking trail is managed and maintained by the Black Forest Club.

Short description 
The Black Forest–Kaiserstuhl–Rhine Trail begins in Donaueschingen. It then runs through the valley of the River Breg up to the watershed between the Danube and the Rhine. Leading through the valleys of Simonswälder Tal and the River Elz, the route reaches the Rhine Plain and the Kaiserstuhl. It ends in Breisach on the Rhine. The entire route is signed and waymarked, with the intention that no maps or route instructions are needed.

Day tours/stages

First Stage: Donaueschingen – Vöhrenbach

Overview 
 Distance: 25,5 km
 Duration: c. 6.5 hours

Route description 

From the start point at Donaueschingen railway station the route runs past the Kreiswehrersatzamt and then left initially along the Brigach, which it crosses on a wooden bridge by Saint Mary's Church.  Following the edge of the wood, the walk reaches the village of Aufen and then Wolterdingen. In Wolterdingen the route turns right at the church and leaves the village along Emil-Hauger-Straße. After the end of the village it goes past the Upper Pond (‘’Oberen Weiher’’) to the right of the path, and then runs for about a kilometre parallel to the Landesstraße on a tarmac track to Tannheim. Passing through Tannheim the route passes a sawmill with a prominent chimney heading for Spitalhöfen, and then heads through the forest to Herzogenweiler. The route only grazes Herzogenweiler and leaves it along Jägerhausallee. At the end of the road the trail turns right. It then goes straight before turning right by a transmission tower on Linienweg, continuing to the forest car park of Schuhbartle. There it crosses the Kreisstraße 5734. The trail then goes along Alte Herzogenweiler Straße on the tarmac of the Kreisstraße, veers right off the metalled track and continues straight on along the road on a grass path to the Schlossermatte. On a bend it goes right, initially steeply uphill and then level over the Ochsenberg and descends again to Saint Michael’s Chapel, next to which there is a barbecue area. The route finally runs along a road to Vöhrenbach, to the end of this stage.

Second Stage: Vöhrenbach – Obersimonswald Engel

Overview 
 Distance: 22.5 km
 Duration: c. 5 hours

Route description

Third Stage: Obersimonswald Engel – Denzlingen

Overview 
 Distance: 23.5 km
 Duration: c. 6 hours

Fourth Stage: Denzlingen – Oberrotweil

Overview 
 Distance: 27.5 km
 Duration: c. 6.5 hours

Fifth Stage: Oberrotweil – Breisach

Overview 
 Distance: 10 km
 Duration: c. 2.5 hours

External links 
 Black Forest hiking service: web facility of the Black Forest Club for visualising the Black Forest trails on Google Maps with various overlays (trail network, waymarks, accommodation, ...)

Hiking trails in Baden-Württemberg
Transport in the Black Forest